Orthocerodus is a genus of beetles in the family Carabidae, containing the following species:

 Orthocerodus atronitens (Fairmaire, 1892)
 Orthocerodus longicollis Jeannel, 1949
 Orthocerodus mirabilis Basilewsky, 1946
 Orthocerodus parallelus Jeannel, 1949
 Orthocerodus puncitsternis Basilewsky, 1977

References

Licininae